Will Tate (20 December 2001) is a professional rugby league footballer who plays as a , er and  for Hull Kingston Rovers in Betfred Super League.

Background
Tate played for Scunthorpe Rugby Club, Cottingham Tigers ARLFC and Skirlaugh A.R.L.F.C. at youth level before signing for the City of Hull Academy in 2017.

Career

Hull Kingston Rovers
Tate made his Super League debut in round 13 of the 2020 Super League season for Hull KR against the Leeds Rhinos. Tate made 4 appearances in 2020 and scored his first Super League try in Hull KR's 22–32 loss to the Huddersfield Giants.

Tate was named in the 2020 Super League Dream Debut Team

Tate made 3 appearances for Hull Kingston Rovers in the 2021 Super League season including the 28-10 semi-final loss away at Catalans Dragons

Tate scored 3 tries in 9 appearances for Hull Kingston Rovers in the 2022 Super League season and scored the opening try in the victory over rivals Hull FC in the final game of the season.

Rochdale Hornets (loan 2021)
Tate made 2 appearances for the Rochdale Hornets in RFL League 1 on loan in 2021, scoring 2 tries against Keighley Cougars.

Dewsbury Rams and Workington Town (loan 2022)
Tate made 1 appearance for the Dewsbury Rams and 7 appearances for Workington Town in Betfred Championshipin 2022.

References

External links
https://hullkr.co.uk/player/will-tate-2/

1999 births
Living people
Dewsbury Rams players
English rugby league players
Hull Kingston Rovers players
Rochdale Hornets players
Rugby league wingers
Rugby league players from Lincolnshire
Workington Town players